Smith Haven Mall is a shopping mall located in Lake Grove, New York (with the western half of the mall in St. James), and is the main mall for the "Mid Island" area of Long Island. It is also the easternmost enclosed mall on Long Island, and thus draws shoppers from the (5) towns that make up the Hamptons, and the North Fork.

The mall has been managed since 1995 by Simon Property Group; it is one of the largest developers of shopping malls in the United States and the owner of Long Island's largest mall, Roosevelt Field in Garden City. Its name is a portmanteau of the towns of Smithtown and Brookhaven, as the mall overlaps the boundaries of these towns, Also the mall overlaps the boundaries of the Smithtown Central School District and Middle Country Central School District.

The mall is anchored by Macy's and Dick's Sporting Goods, with Primark coming soon.

History
Plans for the mall were first announced in October 1965 by Macy's, to be called "Nesconset Shopping Center".  After a preview event with guest of honor Robert Moses on March 10, 1969, the mall, with anchors Macy's and Abraham & Straus (later Stern's and now a lifestyle village), opened on March 12.  They were followed soon after by a  Martin's (later Steinbach, then JCPenney), and then Sears.

The mall is notable for the works of public art which it originally held, including one of the final works of noted sculptor Alexander Calder, a giant mobile Janey Waney which was made especially for the mall's opening in 1969, and a  mural by Larry Rivers.  Calder's piece, after being taken down in early 1970s, was refurbished and moved to the newly built food court in 1987, which was named Calder Court for the sculptor.  The food court was later renamed Saturn Court when the car dealership picked up the food court's sponsorship.  No artwork remains from the gallery which existed at the mall's inception, which also included work from Peter Max, among others.  The Calder piece at the food court sold at auction for $1.7 million in 2002.

One of the developers was Leonard Holzer who was married to art dealer Jane Holzer and the art work originally cost $50,000. After Holzer sold his interest in the mall the art work was dismantled. When the art work was dismantled it was sold off piecemeal with the legs winding up being erected outside the home of East Hampton, New York art dealer Ruth Vered in Sag Harbor, New York. Her home is in the former Bethel Church/former art studio for Abraham Rattner. Vered has said she would lower its foundation to get it under the  limit.

Smith Haven Mall underwent a massive multimillion-dollar renovation project in 2006–2007, in which a lifestyle village was built over the space once occupied by Stern's and the adjacent unused parking lots. Major retailers there include Barnes & Noble Booksellers, Dick's Sporting Goods, and California Pizza Kitchen. Elsewhere in the mall, Abercrombie & Fitch's new concept Gilly Hicks, an underwear store, has opened its doors, as well as Abercrombie & Fitch's upscale RUEHL No.925 (now closed) concept which opened on August 1, 2008. On September 9, 2006, an Apple Store was added to the mall with many on hand to commemorate it. In addition, on November 16, 2006 the newly constructed Cheesecake Factory upscale casual dining restaurant was opened.  In July 2008, Bobby Flay's first Bobby's Burger Palace location was opened at the mall. On June 23, 2017, L.L.Bean opened its first Long Island location at the Smith Haven Mall.

On February 28, 2019, it was announced that the JCPenney store would be closing as part of a plan to close 27 stores nationwide. The store permanently closed on July 5, 2019. A Primark is planned for the former JCPenney at the mall.

On February 12, 2020, it was announced that the Sears store would be closing; Sears previously filed for Chapter 11 Bankruptcy on October 15, 2018. The store was originally expected to close in mid-May, but due to the COVID-19 pandemic the store closed a month earlier on Saturday, April 11, 2020, while the entire mall closed at the same time. This left Dick's Sporting Goods and Macy's as the only anchors left. Ardene and Laderach are coming soon.

In 2022, it was announced that Primark would be taking over the former JCPenney space, opening in October of 2023.

References

External links
Simon Companies Page
Smith Haven Mall renovation plans (Simon 2007)

Smith Haven Mall (Malls of America) (May 21, 2006)

Simon Property Group
Shopping malls established in 1969
Shopping malls in New York (state)
Brookhaven, New York
Smithtown, New York
Buildings and structures in Suffolk County, New York
Tourist attractions in Suffolk County, New York
Shopping malls in the New York metropolitan area
1969 establishments in New York (state)